The Ven Richard Phipps (born Northampton 1865 - died Harrogate 5 October 1934) was Archdeacon of Halifax from 1923 to 1927; and then, when it was renamed, of Pontefract from 1927 to 1930.

Phipps was educated at Dover College; Clare College, Cambridge; and Wells Theological College. Ordained in 1890, he served curacies in Great Yarmouth and Wakefield. He was Diocesan Chaplain of Wakefield from 1894 to 1896; Vicar of Brighouse from 1896 to 1901; and then of Kirkburton from 1901.  A freemason, he was Grand Chaplain of England in 1926. He was a Member of West Riding County Council from 1913 to 1928.

References

1865 births
19th-century English Anglican priests
20th-century English Anglican priests
People educated at Dover College
Alumni of Wells Theological College
Alumni of Clare College, Cambridge
Archdeacons of Halifax
Archdeacons of Pontefract
1934 deaths
Freemasons of the United Grand Lodge of England